Maanaya is a 2019 Sri Lankan Sinhala action thriller film directed by Anju Dhananjaya as his debut direction and produced by Roshan Indika Ralapanawa for Dian Films. It stars Wasantha Kumaravila and Upeksha Swarnamali in lead role along with Hemantha Iriyagama and Pavithra Wickramasinghe. Music composed by Nilantha Siri Pathirana.

Cast
 Wasantha Kumaravila as Vikum
 Upeksha Swarnamali
 Hemantha Iriyagama 
 Pavithra Wickramasinghe
 Dileep Manohara
 Sumudu Amalka as Angam Gurunnanse
 Prasanna Udagearachchi
 Kasun Dushantha
 Shanaka Dilum Bandara
 Rasika Kumara
 Roshan Aski
 Laksiri Silva
 Nishshanka de Silva

References

External links
 

2019 films
2010s Sinhala-language films